Samotsvety (which means "Semiprecious Stones") is a Soviet VIA band formed in 1971, in Moscow. It became one of the more successful and better known VIA bands, recording a number of hits and serving as a springboard to fame for several Russian musicians, including Dmitry Malikov, Vladimir Presnyakov Sr., and Alexander Barykin.

History 
The band Samotsvety, was founded by Yuriy Malikov, a Recognized National Artist of Russia and the father of Dmitry Malikov. The group produced a string of hits in the 1970s, including "Moy adres Sovetskii Soyuz" (My address is the Soviet Union), "Tam, za oblakami" (There, beyond the clouds), "Vsya zhizn vperedi" (My whole life is still ahead), "Ne povtoriayetsia takoye nikogda" (Something like this will never happen again), "Vse chto v zhizni yest u menia" (All that I have in my life), "Shkonlniy bal" (School dance), and "Na zemlie zhivet liubov" (There lives love on this earth), among others.

The year 1975 was a turning point for the band. It was the year they recorded "Esli budem my vdvoyem" (If it will be the two of us), which became a massive hit and topped the charts in the former Soviet Union. The same year, an album released in Berlin, Germany called "Famous world bands" featured this Samotsvety song alongside hits by the Beatles, Creedence Clearwater Revival, and Shocking Blue. In 1975 Samotsvety also acquired two musical talents that would remain with them through the years, the husband-and-wife team of Vladimir Presnyakov, Sr. and Elena Presnyakova.

The band broke up in the late 1980s when many VIAs were going away as a result of changes in both government censorship and popular tastes. However, in 1996, Yuriy Malikov decided to celebrate the 25-year anniversary of the band by bringing together many of the ex-members for an episode of the television series "Zolotoy shlyager" (Golden hit). The unexpected popularity of the program when it aired made Malikov decide to reconstitute the band. The band successfully resumed its musical career, touring with a program that combined old hits with new releases. The band's new songs included "Proshlogodniye glaza" (Last year's eyes), "Regtaim na Titanike" (Ragtime on the Titanic), and "Sneg Rozhdestva" (Christmas Snow).

The forecasting group Samotsvety Forecasting is named after this band.

Discography 
1973 —  (VIA Samotsvety)

1974 —  (For us, young ones)

1981 —  (Path to the heart)

1985 —  (Weather forecast)

1995 —  (There, beyond the clouds)

1996 —  (All that I have in my life)

1996 —  (Twenty years later)

1997 —  (We became different)

2003 —  (Star names)

2004 —  (Mood for love)

2008 —  (Samotsvety) GRAND Collection

2009 —  (Samotsvety)

2011 —  (Samotsvety with stars)

References

External links 
 
 http://www.samotsvety.ru/ - official site 

Musical groups from Moscow
Russian pop music groups
Beat groups
Alternative dance musical groups
Soviet musical groups
Musical groups established in 1971